Rothmannia is a genus of flowering plants in the family Rubiaceae. It was described in 1776 and is named for Göran Rothman (1739–1778) by Thunberg – both were pupils of Linnaeus.

Description
Although Rubiaceae flowers are generally organized in many-flowered inflorescences, solitary flowers are also found in this genus. The reduction of the number of flowers per inflorescence is often invertedly proportionate to the size of the flowers, which explains the large solitary flowers of some Rothmannia.

Distribution and species
The genus originally had wide distribution, but is now restricted to species found in tropical and southern Africa:

 Rothmannia annae (E.P. Wright) Keay
 Rothmannia capensis Thunb.
 Rothmannia ebamutensis Sonké
 Rothmannia engleriana (K.Schum.) Keay
 Rothmannia fischeri (K.Schum.) Bullock ex Oberm.
 Rothmannia globosa (Hochst.) Keay
 Rothmannia hispida (K.Schum.) Fagerl.
 Rothmannia jollyana N. Hallé
 Rothmannia lateriflora (K.Schum.) Keay
 Rothmannia libisa N. Hallé
 Rothmannia liebrechtsiana (De Wild. & T. Durand) Keay
 Rothmannia longiflora Salisb.
 Rothmannia lujae (De Wild.) Keay
 Rothmannia macrocarpa (Hiern) Keay
 Rothmannia macrosiphon (K.Schum.) Bridson
 Rothmannia manganjae (Hiern) Keay
 Rothmannia mayumbensis(R.D. Good) Keay
 Rothmannia munsae (Schweinf. ex Hiern) E.M.A. Petit
 Rothmannia octomera (Hook.) Fagerl.
 Rothmannia ravae (Chiov.) Bridson
 Rothmannia talbotii (Wernham) Keay
 Rothmannia urcelliformis (Hiern) Bullock ex Robyns
 Rothmannia whitfieldii (Lindl.) Dandy

Asian species moved to other genera
The species found in western Indian Ocean, southern China to Indo-China and New Guinea are now placed in other genera, especially Ridsdalea: IPNI - Rubiaceae: Ridsdalea J.T.Pereira & K.M.Wong 
 R. attopevensis (Pit.) Bremek.
 R. daweishanensis Y.M. Shui & W.H. Chen
 R. eucodon (K.Schum.) Bremek.
 R. kampucheana Tirveng.
 R. kuchingensis (W.W.Sm.) K.M. Wong and R. malayana K.M. Wong are synonyms of Ridsdalea grandis (Korth.) J.T.Pereira
 R. macromera (Lauterb. & K.Schum.) Fagerl.
 R. merrillii (Elmer) J.T. Pereira & Ridsdale
 R. pulcherrima (Kurz) Tirveng.
 R. schoemannii (Teijsm. & Binn.) Tirveng.
 R. sootepensis (Craib) Bremek.
 R. thailandica Tirveng.
 R. uranthera (C.E.C. Fisch.) Tirveng.
 R. venalis Bremek.
 R. vidalii Bremek.
 R. vietnamensis Tirveng.
 R. wittii (Craib) Bremek.Rothmannia macrophylla (Hook.f.) Bremek. is a synonym of Singaporandia macrophylla'' (Hook.f.) K.M.Wong

References

External links
Rothmannia in the World Checklist of Rubiaceae

 
Rubiaceae genera
Taxonomy articles created by Polbot